San Toy is a ghost town in southeastern Bearfield Township, Perry County, Ohio, Perry County, Ohio, United States.  A flourishing community in the early 20th century, it was a coal town created by the Sunday Creek Coal Company.

Decline
According to the 1930 census, San Toy was the town in the United States whose population had decreased the most per capita since the previous census (976 in 1920 to just 128 in 1930). In 1931, 17 of the 19 registered voters voted to abandon the town.  Today approximately 50 people live in the area that was once San Toy.  Many foundations and roads of the once busy town remain.  A local road is named in its honor.

See also
 New Straitsville mine fire

References

 Ben Hayes, San Toy: A Ghost Town in the Hocking Valley Coal Fields (Ohio Folklore Society, 1959)

External links
 San Toy, Ohio
 Exploring A Ghost Town from the Zanesville Times Recorder, April 8, 2002
 San Toy: Ghost Town or Diamond in the Rough? from Athens News, December 9, 2002

Geography of Perry County, Ohio
Ghost towns in Ohio
Coal towns in Ohio